Keeper: Living with Nancy is a 2009 biographical book written by Andrea Gillies which centers around Alzheimer's disease. It won the Wellcome Book Prize and Orwell Prize.

Plot

The book is the account of Andrea Gillies' mother-in-law, Nancy, who had been diagnosed with Alzheimer's. It follows how Gillies and her family care for her during her illness while also managing their house, a 22-room B&B. It also describes how Nancy changes and how it affects the family.

Awards

2009 Wellcome Book Prize
2010 Orwell Prize

References

2009 non-fiction books
British biographies
Books about Alzheimer's disease